Acacia longipedunculata is a species of wattle native to north Queensland.

References

longipedunculata
Flora of Queensland